List of speakers of the Anguilla House of Assembly.

Below is a list of office-holders:

Sources

Speakers
Anguilla
Speakers